The 2017 Croatian Cup Final between Dinamo Zagreb and Rijeka was played on 31 May 2017 in Varaždin.

Road to the final

Match details

External links 
Official website 

2017 Final
GNK Dinamo Zagreb matches
HNK Rijeka matches
Cup Final